Honoré Bonet (c. 1340 – c. 1410) was a Provençal Benedictine, the prior of Salon near Embrun.

Bonet studied at the University of Avignon where he received a doctorate and traveled around France and Aragon. He wrote on philosophy, law, politics, and heraldry. In his work L'arbre des batailles (The Tree of Battles) (c. 1382-87) Bonet deals with war and the laws of war, written in the form of a scholastic dialogue: each chapter starts with a yes/no question, proceeds with a dialogue, and concludes. The book was written to obtain favour of Charles V of France, but without much effect. However, it became a manual for commanders and a lot of European rulers and gentlemen had this book in their libraries as well. In 1456 it was translated to English in the Rosslyn castle for Gilbert de la Haye, Chancellor of Scotland, Earl of Orkney and Caithness.

Bonet was deeply influenced by Bartolo de Sassoferrato and Bonet himself was very influential in the 15th century. The 'Arbre des batailles' was a main source for Christine de Pizan's 'Livre des fais d'armes et de chevalerie' (Book of Deeds of Arms and of Chivalry), and her writing was in turn popularized by William Caxton in England. Jean Courtois, herald of Alfonso V of Aragon, also used Bonet extensively in his 'Blason des Couleurs'.

Martin van Creveld writes that Bonet's subject "was not so much military theory and practice as the art of 'chivalry' and the rules of war." According to van Creveld, such works "are little more than handbooks... Taking the formations and armament of their own day more or less for granted, however, they seldom rise above the specifics of time and place... The fact that some of them were in actual use until 1700 and beyond shows how indebted early modern Europe felt itself to the ancient world—or, conversely, how slow the evolution of warfare was. Unlike the Chinese classics they do not provide a coherent philosophy of war."

Other works by Bonet are L'Apparicion maistre Jehan de Meun and the Somnium super materia scismatis (1394).

Editions and Translations
 The first French edition Lyon 1481. Thereafter it was published several times, including Bruxelles 1883.
 The Tree of Battles of Honoré Bonet, trans. G. W. Coopland, Liverpool: At the University Press, 1949.

Notes

References

External links 
Bonet's Arbre des Batailles (1387) by François Velde

1340 births
1410 deaths
Year of birth uncertain
Year of death uncertain
People from Provence

French heraldists
French Benedictines